Al-Jam'iyya al-Islamiyya may refer to:
 Islamic Society of North America
 Muslim American Society
 American Muslim Society
 Al-Jam'iyya al-Islamiyya al-Wataniyya, a Zionist-supported organization founded in Mandatory Palestine in 1921
 Muslim-Christian Associations (Al-Jam'iah al-Islamiya al-Massihiya)
 Nadi al-Jam'iyya al-Islamiyya, a sports club and football team based in Gaza